Jann Haworth (born 1942) is a British-American pop artist. A pioneer of soft sculpture, she is best known as the co-creator of The Beatles' Sgt. Pepper's Lonely Hearts Club Band album cover. Haworth is also an advocate for feminist rights especially for the representation of women in the art world.

Life and work

Early years
Haworth was born in 1942 and raised in Hollywood, California. Her mother Miriam Haworth was a distinguished ceramist, printmaker, and painter. Her father, Ted Haworth, was an Academy Award-winning art director. Since Haworth was surrounded by artistic talent from a young age, she describes the experience as having a strong influential impact on the development of her artistic goals and the presentations of her artworks-whether they were installation pieces or two dimensional:

After years of experimental artwork as a young artist, Jann Haworth took her talents to the University of California, Los Angeles in 1959.

1960s
After two years at UCLA, she moved in 1961 to London, England, where she studied art history at the Courtauld Institute of Art and studio art at the Slade School of Fine Art. Haworth reveled in being a rebellious woman artist within a conservative, male-dominated institution like the Slade.

It was in those formative years at art school that her aesthetic sense was first established. She began experimenting with sewn and stuffed soft sculptures. She made still life items (flowers, doughnuts) and quickly progressed to her now iconic "Old Lady" doll and other life-sized figures. Her work often contained specific references to American culture and to Hollywood in particular, as is readily apparent in her dummies of Mae West, Shirley Temple and W. C. Fields.

Haworth soon became a leading figure of the British Pop Art movement, and joined Pauline Boty as one of its only female practitioners in London. Her first major exhibition was at the Institute of Contemporary Arts in 1963, where she was selected to participate in 4 Young Artists (18 September – 19 October 1963) alongside British artists John Howlin, Brian Mills, and John Pearson. Three shows at the Robert Fraser Gallery in London followed, two of which were solo exhibitions.  Her work was seen in Amsterdam and Milan and also was featured in the Hayward Gallery's landmark exhibition of Pop Art in 1968. That same year, she and her then-husband, Pop artist Peter Blake, won a Grammy for their album cover design of The Beatles' Sgt. Pepper's Lonely Hearts Club Band.

Haworth was a visionary and a pioneer in the face of the American feminist movements of the 1960s by challenging gendered stereotypes through her artworks, while emphasizing the importance of having a female identity that emphasized iconic female symbols in her soft sculptures. Haworth refused to let her male peers intimidate her and diminish her success.

Sgt. Pepper's Lonely Hearts Club Band

Gallery owner Robert Fraser suggested to The Beatles that they commission Peter Blake and Haworth to design the cover for Sgt. Pepper's Lonely Hearts Club Band. The original concept was to have The Beatles dressed in their new "Northern brass band" uniforms appearing at an official ceremony in a park.  For the great crowd gathered at this imaginary event, John Lennon, Paul McCartney, and George Harrison, as well as Haworth, Blake, and Fraser, all submitted a list of characters they wanted to see in attendance. Blake and Haworth then pasted life-size, black-and-white photographs of all the approved characters onto hardboard, which Haworth subsequently hand-tinted. Haworth also added several cloth dummies to the assembly, including one of her "Old Lady" figures and a Shirley Temple doll who wears a "Welcome The Rolling Stones" sweater. Inspired by the municipal flower-clock in Hammersmith, West London, Haworth came up with the idea of writing out the name of the band in civic flower-bed lettering as well.

1970s to today
In the 1970s, she and Blake were members of the Brotherhood of Ruralists, a group of artists that also included Ann and Graham Arnold, Annie and Graham Ovenden, and David Inshaw. In 1979 she founded and ran The Looking Glass School near Bath, Somerset, an arts-and-crafts primary and middle school. In the same year, she separated from Blake and commenced living with her present husband, the writer Richard Severy. During the subsequent two decades, her artistic career took second place to her commitment to raising a young family (two daughters, three stepdaughters, and a son).  Still, she found time to illustrate (as Karen Haworth) six of Severy's books: Mystery Pig (1983), Unicorn Trap (1984), Rat's Castle (1985), High Jinks (1986), Burners and Breakers (1987), and Sea Change (1987). She also created five covers for the 1981 Methuen Arden Shakespeare editions of Richard III, Macbeth, Twelfth Night, Henry the Fifth, and Coriolanus.  Haworth also authored three "how-to" art books for children: Paint (1993), Collage (1994), and Painting and Sticking (with Miriam Haworth, 1995).

After mounting two solo exhibitions at Gimpel fils, London, in the mid-1990s, Haworth won a fellowship in 1997 to study American quilt-making. She returned to the United States and took up residence in Sundance, Utah, where she founded the Art Shack Studios and Glass Recycling Works, and co-founded the Sundance Mountain Charter School (now the Soldier Hollow Charter School). Since then, her career has exhibited in solo exhibitions at the Mayor Gallery, London (2006), Wolverhampton Art Gallery (2007), and Galerie du Centre, Paris (2008). She also has been represented in numerous Pop art retrospectives, including "Pop Art UK" (Modena, 2004), "Pop Art and the 60s: This Was Tomorrow" (London, 2004), "Pop Art! 1956-1968" (Rome, 2007), and "Seductive Subversion: Women Pop Artists, 1958-1968" (Philadelphia, 2009).

SLC PEPPER

In 2004, Haworth began work on SLC PEPPER, a 50-feet × 30-feet civic wall mural in downtown Salt Lake City, Utah, representing an updated version of the Sgt. Pepper's Lonely Hearts Club Band album cover. As Haworth stated, "The original album cover, famous though it is, is an icon ready for the iconoclast. We will be turning the original inside out... ethnic and gender balancing, and evaluating for contemporary relevance." Together with over thirty local, national, and international artists of all ages, Haworth created a new set of "heroes and heroines of the 21st century" in stencil graffiti, replacing each of the personalities depicted in the original. Only the Beatles' jackets remain as metal cut-outs with head and hand holes so that visitors may "become part of the piece" by taking souvenir photos. The first phase of the mural's construction was completed in 2005. SLC PEPPER remains an ongoing arts project, where local artists will continue to add to its design.

Among the more than 100 new people included in SLC PEPPER are: Adbusters, Akira Kurosawa, Alice, Alice Walker, Annie Lennox, Banksy's Rat, B.B. King, Beastie Boys, Benicio del Toro, Billie Holiday, Björk, Bob Marley, César Chávez, Charlize Theron, Cindy Sherman, Dalai Lama, David Bowie, David Hockney, Ellen DeGeneres, Erykah Badu, Eudora Welty, Enid (Thora Birch), Eve Ensler, Felix the Cat, Frank Zappa, Frida Kahlo, Garrison Keillor, Gandhi, Mikhail Gorbachev, Gore Vidal, Guerrilla Girls, Harvey Pekar, Hedwig, Howard Zinn, Jackie Robinson, Jane Goodall, Jean-Michel Basquiat, Jeff Bridges, Katharine Hepburn, Laurie Anderson, Lee Krasner, Little My and the Snork Maiden, Louise Brooks, Martin Luther King Jr., Maya Angelou, Maya Lin, Miles Davis, Mother Jones, Muddy Waters, Nelson Mandela, Pablo Picasso, Peter Gabriel, Robert Rauschenberg, Ray Charles, Richard Feynman, Rosa Parks, Samuel Beckett, Sojourner Truth, Sylvia Plath, Terry Gilliam, Tom Waits, Thom Yorke, Toni Morrison, and Tony Kushner.

Selected exhibitions

Solo exhibitions

1966 Robert Fraser Gallery, London
1966 Gallerie 20, Amsterdam
1968 Studio Marconi, Milan
1969 Robert Fraser Gallery, London
1971 "New Sculpture by Jann Haworth" Sidney Janis Gallery, New York City
1972 Arnolfini, Bristol
1974 Waddington Galleries, London
1993, 1995 Gimpel fils, London
2000 Sundance Screening Room, Utah
2006 "Jann Haworth: Artist's Cut" - Mayor Gallery, London
2008 "Jann Haworth" - Galerie du Centre, Paris
2009 "POP Jann Haworth" - Wolverhampton Art Gallery, UK
2017 "Never The Less" Emmanuel Art Gallery at the University of Colorado Denver - Denver, Colorado
2019-20 "Jann Haworth: Close Up" Pallant House Gallery, Chichester

Group exhibitions

1963 "Four Young Artists" - Institute of Contemporary Arts, London
1963 "Young Contemporaries" - RBA Galleries, London
1968 "Works from 1956 to 1967" - Robert Fraser Gallery, London
1968 "Pop Art" - Hayward Gallery, London
1970 "Figures/Environments" - Walker Art Center, Minneapolis [traveling exhibition]
1972 "Sharp-Focus Realism by 28 Painters and Sculptors" - Sidney Janis Gallery, New York City
1994 "Worlds in a Box: Cornell, Fluxus, Herms, LeWitt, Samara" - Whitechapel Gallery, London
2004 "Pop Art UK: British Pop Art, 1958-1972" - Galleria Civica di Modena, Italy
2004 "Art and the 60s: This Was Tomorrow" - Tate Britain, London
2005 "British Pop" - Museo de Bellas Artes de Bilbao, Spain
2007 "Pop Art! 1956-1968" - Scuderie del Quirinale, Rome
2010 "Seductive Subversion: Women Pop Artists, 1958-1968" - University of the Arts, Philadelphia [traveling exhibition]
2013 "Work to Do: Trent Alvey, Pam Bowman, Jann Haworth, Amy Jorgensen" - Brigham Young University Museum of Art, Utah

Public collections 

 Arts Council of Great Britain
 Hirshhorn Museum and Sculpture Garden, Washington DC
 Walker Art Center, Minneapolis, MN
 Museum Folkwang, Essen, Germany
 São Paulo Museum of Modern Art, Brazil
 Sintra Museum of Modern Art-Berardo Collection, Portugal
 Pallant House Gallery, West Sussex, England
 Wolverhampton Art Gallery, Wolverhampton, England
 Utah Museum of Fine Arts, Salt Lake City, Utah

Awards

1967 Edinburgh 400 Prize winner
1968 Grammy Award for Best Album Cover, Graphic Arts, Jann Haworth and Peter Blake (art directors) for Sgt. Pepper's Lonely Hearts Club Band by The Beatles
1997 Churchill Fellowship specially designated Robert Fraser Award

References

Bibliography

Books

 Image as Language, Christopher Finch (1969, Pelican)
 Goodbye Baby and Amen by David Bailey and Peter Evans (1969, Coward-McCann Inc. New York), p 44
 Pop Art Re-defined by John Russell and Suzi Gablik (1969, Frederick A Praeger Inc. New York), plates 11, 43 and 126
 Pop Art: An Illustrated Dictionary by Jose Pierre (1977, Eyre Methuen).
 The Brotherhood of Ruralists, Nicholas Isherwood (1981, Lund Humphries, London) pp 42, 49-50 and 65
 Pop Art, Tilman Osterwold (1989, Cosmo Press, Cologne) p 42
 Pop Art, A Continuing History, Marco Livingstone (1990, Thames and Hudson, London) pp 166, 168-9, 257-8, 236-238
 Blinds and Shutters, Michael Cooper and Bryan Roylance (1990, Genesis, Guildford, England) pp 53, 55, 58, 114, 188, 238-9, 262-3 and 267
 Walker Art Center – Painting and Sculpture from the Collection Martin L Friedman (1990, Rizzoli International Publications)
 Summer of Love, George Martin (1994, Macmillan, London)
 Small Histories : Studies of Western Art, N.P. James (CV Publications, 2007)

Exhibition catalogues

 Sharp Focus Realism (Sidney Janis Gallery, New York, 1972), p 13
 The Pop 60's: Transatlantic Crossing (Centro Cultural de Belem, Portugal, 1997), pp 156–7
 Pop Art UK 1956-72 (Galleria Civica di Modena, Italy, 2004), pp 102 and 179, plates 103 and 105
 Art and the Sixties: This was Tomorrow (Tate Britain, 2004), pp 13, 25, 137 and plate 24
 British Pop (Museo de Bellas Artes, Bilbao, Spain, 2005), pp 422 and 466, plates 163, 167 and 171
 Artist's Cut: Jann Haworth (Mayor Gallery, London, 2006)
 Pop Art! 1956-1968 (Scuderie del Quirinale, Rome, 2007), pp 140 and 291, plate 32
 POP Jann Haworth (Wolverhampton Art Gallery, Wolverhampton, 2009)

External links 
Jann Haworth Official Website
Jann Haworth on artnet
 POP Jann Haworth at Wolverhampton Art Gallery
Interview with Jann Haworth in TATE, ETC. Issue 1 (Summer 2004)

Videos
Artist Snapshot: Jann Haworth, Davey Davis
, Park City Television, 2008
, Channel 2 News, Utah

1942 births
Living people
Album-cover and concert-poster artists
American pop artists
American women sculptors
Brotherhood of Ruralists
University of California, Los Angeles alumni
Alumni of the Courtauld Institute of Art
Alumni of the Slade School of Fine Art
20th-century American women artists
21st-century American women artists